The 1999 Sun Belt Conference men's basketball tournament was held February 27–March 2 at the Cajundome at the University of Southwestern Louisiana in Lafayette, Louisiana.

 defeated  in the championship game, 65–48, to win their first Sun Belt men's basketball tournament.

The Indians, in turn, received an automatic bid to the 1999 NCAA tournament, their first appearance in the Division I event. No other Sun Belt members earned bids to the tournament.

Format
The Sun Belt once again saw changes in its membership; three teams departed the conference, Jacksonville (TAAC), Lamar (Southland), and Texas–Pan American (Independent), while one was added, Florida International (TAAC). Total membership reduced from ten to eight.

With the membership changes came some slight modifications to the tournament format. All eight teams, seeded based on regular season conference records, were now placed directly into the initial quarterfinal round as part of a single-elimination style bracket.

Bracket

See also
Sun Belt Conference women's basketball tournament

References

Sun Belt Conference men's basketball tournament
Tournament
Sun Belt Conference men's basketball tournament
Sun Belt Conference men's basketball tournament
Sun Belt Conference men's basketball tournament